Columbus Historic District in Columbus, Georgia is a historic district that was listed on the National Register of Historic Places in 1969.  Its area was increased in 1988.  The original district included 20 city blocks and nine partial city blocks, and was bounded by the Chattahoochee River on the west, Ninth Street on the north, Fourth Avenue (U.S. Highway 27) on the east, and Fourth Street on the south.

The expanded district included 343 contributing buildings, one other structure, three sites, and one object (an 1879 Confederate war memorial).

Fifteen of the historic houses had been moved but were still deemed to contribute to the historic character of the district.

It includes the antebellum octagon house at 527 1st Avenue, a National Historic Landmark, named Octagon House or May's Folly.

See also
 Garrett & Sons Wholesale

References

Historic districts on the National Register of Historic Places in Georgia (U.S. state)
Georgian architecture in Georgia (U.S. state)
Greek Revival architecture in Georgia (U.S. state)
Victorian architecture in Georgia (U.S. state)
Historic districts in Columbus, Georgia
National Register of Historic Places in Muscogee County, Georgia